Naoya Uematsu (born September 10, 1978) is a retired Japanese mixed martial artist who competed in the bantamweight, featherweight and lightweight divisions in Cage Force,  DEEP and Shooto. He is the head instructor of the NEXUSENSE gym. In addition, Uematsu is a director and referee director of the Japan Brazilian Jiu-Jitsu Federation (JBJJF). He is a director and strengthening committee member of the Japan Sambo Federation and chairman of the refereeing committee and the vice Chairman of the Japan MMA Refereeing Organization (JMOC).

Mixed martial arts career
Uematsu began at the age of 12 in junior high school. He started training in shoot wrestling at Shooto Gym K'z Factory under Kazuhiro Kusayanagi when he was 16 and immediately became an undefeated champion in amateur competitions. He also trained in sumo wrestling, sambo and muay thai at the Crosspoint Gym. He is a Brazilian Jiu-Jitsu black belt with training under Biviano Fernandez and Leonardo Vieira.

Early career
Uematsu debuted in the Lumax Cup lightweight tournament in 1997 defeating Takashi Ochi and Mitsuo Matsumoto. He made it to the finals, where he defeated Caol Uno via achilles lock under twenty three seconds in the first round.

Shooto
Uematsu would rack up an undefeated 11-0-2 record in 6 years in Shooto defeating luminaries such as Katsuya Toida and Noboru Asahi. His streak came to an end on September 16th, 2002 on a loss to Bao Quach at Shooto: Treasure Hunt 10. Uematsu faced Joao Roque on January 24, 2003, losing via unanimous decision. Uematsu would go on to face Jens Pulver, Gilbert Melendez and Hideki Kadowaki later in his Shooto career. He left Shooto in 2006 at a record of 14-5-2, following a loss to Kenji Osawa.

Later career
Uematsu would go 1-3-0 in the final two years of his mixed martial arts career, with losses to Urijah Faber and Marcos Galvao. His only win was over James Doolan at Cage Force, via heel hook. He retired in 2008, following a loss to Daiki Hata at Deep: 39 Impact.

Championships and accomplishments

Mixed martial arts
All Japan Amateur Shooto
All Japan Amateur Shooto Tournament Runner-up (1996)
Lumax Cup
Tournament of J Lightweight Tournament (1997)

Sambo
All Japan Sambo Championships
All Japan Sambo Championship, Senior 68kg, 2nd place (1998)
All Japan Sambo Championship, Senior 68kg, 3rd place (2002)
All Japan Sambo Championship, 68kg class champion (2008)

Submission wrestling
'''ADCC
ADCC JAPAN TRIAL Under 66kg champion (2007)

Mixed martial arts record

|-
| Loss
| align=center| 15-8-2
| Daiki Hata
| TKO (punches)
| Deep: 39 Impact
| 
| align=center| 1
| align=center| 2:30
| Tokyo, Japan
| 
|-
| Win
| align=center| 15-7-2
| James Doolan
| Submission (heel hook)
| GCM: Cage Force 6
| 
| align=center| 1
| align=center| 2:26
| Tokyo, Japan
| 
|-
| Loss
| align=center| 14-7-2
| Marcos Galvao
| Decision (unanimous)
| Fury FC 1: Warlords Unleashed
| 
| align=center| 3
| align=center| 5:00
| São Paulo, Brazil
| 
|-
| Loss
| align=center| 14-6-2
| Urijah Faber
| TKO (punches)
| GC 51: Madness at the Memorial
| 
| align=center| 2
| align=center| 3:35
| Sacramento, California, United States
| 
|-
| Loss
| align=center| 14-5-2
| Kenji Osawa
| Decision (majority)
| Shooto: The Victory of the Truth
| 
| align=center| 3
| align=center| 5:00
| Tokyo, Japan
| 
|-
| Loss
| align=center| 14-4-2
| Gilbert Melendez
| TKO (cut)
| Shooto: 5/4 in Korakuen Hall
| 
| align=center| 2
| align=center| 4:30
| Tokyo, Japan
| 
|-
| Win
| align=center| 14-3-2
| Hideki Kadowaki
| Technical Submission (guillotine choke)
| Shooto: Shooto Junkie Is Back!
| 
| align=center| 1
| align=center| 0:45
| Chiba, Japan
| 
|-
| Loss
| align=center| 13-3-2
| Jens Pulver
| KO (punch)
| Shooto: 3/22 in Korakuen Hall
| 
| align=center| 1
| align=center| 2:09
| Tokyo, Japan
| 
|-
| Win
| align=center| 13-2-2
| Katsuya Toida
| Submission (achilles lock)
| Shooto: Wanna Shooto 2003
| 
| align=center| 1
| align=center| 4:06
| Tokyo, Japan
| 
|-
| Win
| align=center| 12-2-2
| Jin Kazeta
| Submission (armbar)
| Shooto: 7/13 in Korakuen Hall
| 
| align=center| 1
| align=center| 1:38
| Tokyo, Japan
| 
|-
| Loss
| align=center| 11-2-2
| Joao Roque
| Decision (unanimous)
| Shooto: 1/24 in Korakuen Hall
| 
| align=center| 3
| align=center| 5:00
| Tokyo, Japan
| 
|-
| Loss
| align=center| 11-1-2
| Bao Quach
| Decision (unanimous)
| Shooto: Treasure Hunt 10
| 
| align=center| 2
| align=center| 5:00
| Yokohama, Kanagawa, Japan
| 
|-
| Draw
| align=center| 11-0-2
| Kazuhiro Inoue
| Draw
| Shooto: Gig Central 1
| 
| align=center| 3
| align=center| 5:00
| Nagoya, Aichi, Japan
| 
|-
| Win
| align=center| 11-0-1
| Mike Cardoso
| Decision (unanimous)
| Shooto: To The Top 1
| 
| align=center| 3
| align=center| 5:00
| Tokyo, Japan
| 
|-
| Win
| align=center| 10-0-1
| Noboru Asahi
| Decision (majority)
| Shooto: R.E.A.D. 10
| 
| align=center| 3
| align=center| 5:00
| Tokyo, Japan
| 
|-
| Win
| align=center| 9-0-1
| Joey Gilbert
| Submission (achilles lock)
| Shooto: R.E.A.D. 6
| 
| align=center| 2
| align=center| 3:22
| Tokyo, Japan
| 
|-
| Win
| align=center| 8-0-1
| Kimihito Nonaka
| Technical Submission (armbar)
| Shooto: Renaxis 4
| 
| align=center| 3
| align=center| 3:11
| Tokyo, Japan
| 
|-
| Win
| align=center| 7-0-1
| Ryan Diaz
| Submission (achilles lock)
| SB 12: SuperBrawl 12
| 
| align=center| 1
| align=center| 1:51
| Honolulu, Hawaii, United States
| 
|-
| Win
| align=center| 6-0-1
| Eric Payne
| Submission (heel hook)
| Shooto: Gig '99
| 
| align=center| 1
| align=center| 0:16
| Tokyo, Japan
| 
|-
| Win
| align=center| 5-0-1
| Mamoru Okochi
| TKO (punches)
| Shooto: Shooter's Soul
| 
| align=center| 2
| align=center| 1:22
| Setagaya, Tokyo, Japan
| 
|-
| Draw
| align=center| 4-0-1
| Kimihito Nonaka
| Draw
| Shooto: Las Grandes Viajes 6
| 
| align=center| 2
| align=center| 5:00
| Tokyo, Japan
| 
|-
| Win
| align=center| 4-0
| Katsuya Toida
| Submission (armbar)
| Shooto: Shooter's Dream
| 
| align=center| 1
| align=center| 2:46
| Setagaya, Tokyo, Japan
| 
|-
| Win
| align=center| 3-0
| Caol Uno
| Submission (achilles lock)
| Lumax Cup: Tournament of J '97 Lightweight Tournament
| 
| align=center| 1
| align=center| 0:23
| Japan
| 
|-
| Win
| align=center| 2-0
| Mitsuo Matsumoto
| Decision (unanimous)
| Lumax Cup: Tournament of J '97 Lightweight Tournament
| 
| align=center| 2
| align=center| 3:00
| Japan
| 
|-
| Win
| align=center| 1-0
| Takashi Ochi
| Submission (heel hook)
| Lumax Cup: Tournament of J '97 Lightweight Tournament
| 
| align=center| 1
| align=center| 2:18
| Japan
|

See also
List of male mixed martial artists

References

1978 births
Japanese male mixed martial artists
Bantamweight mixed martial artists
Featherweight mixed martial artists
Lightweight mixed martial artists
Mixed martial artists utilizing judo
Mixed martial artists utilizing sambo
Mixed martial artists utilizing Muay Thai
Mixed martial artists utilizing Sumo
Mixed martial artists utilizing Brazilian jiu-jitsu
Mixed martial arts referees
Japanese practitioners of Brazilian jiu-jitsu
People awarded a black belt in Brazilian jiu-jitsu
Japanese sambo practitioners
Japanese male judoka
Japanese Muay Thai practitioners
Living people